The Chinese sovereign was the ruler of a particular monarchical regime in the historical periods of ancient China and imperial China. Sovereigns ruling the same regime, and descended from the same paternal line, constituted a dynasty. Several titles and naming schemes have been used throughout Chinese history.

Sovereign titles

Emperor

The characters Huang (皇 huáng "august (ruler)") and Di (帝 dì "divine ruler") had been used separately and never consecutively (see Three August Ones and Five Emperors).  The character was reserved for mythological rulers until the first emperor of Qin (Qin Shi Huang), who created a new title Huangdi (皇帝 in pinyin: huáng dì) for himself in 221 BCE, which is commonly translated as Emperor in English.  This title continued in use until the fall of the Qing dynasty in 1912.

From the Han Dynasty, the title Huangdi could also be abbreviated to huang or di.  The former nobility titles Qing (卿), Daifu (大夫) and Shi (仕) became synonyms for court officials.

The power of the emperor varied between emperors and dynasties, with some emperors being absolute rulers and others being figureheads with actual power lying in the hands of court factions, eunuchs, the bureaucracy or noble families. In principle, the title of emperor was transmitted from father to son via primogeniture, as endorsed by Confucianism. However, there are many exceptions to this rule. For example, because the Emperor usually had many concubines, the first born of the empress (i.e. the chief consort) is usually the heir apparent. However, Emperors could elevate another more favoured child or the child of a favourite concubine to the status of Crown Prince. Disputes over succession occurred regularly and have led to a number of civil wars. In the Qing dynasty, primogeniture was abandoned altogether, with the designated heir kept secret until after the Emperor's death.

Of the San Huang Wu Di, the three first of them were called 皇 (huang, "august (ruler)") and the five last were called 帝 (di, "divine ruler"), which can translate as either emperor, demigod, divine ancestor, or superhuman. This title may have been used in the Shang and Xia dynasties, though oracle bones were found from the Shang Dynasty showing the title 王 (wáng, "king").

King
The king (王, wáng) was the Chinese head of state during the Zhou Dynasty. Its use during the Xia and Shang is uncertain but possible: the character has been found upon oracle bones. It was abolished under the Qin and, after that, the same term was used for (and translated as) royal princes. The title was commonly given to members of the Emperor's family and could be inherited.  A poem from about 2,500 years ago said "普天之下,莫非王土.率土之賓,莫非王臣" which roughly translates as "Under the sky, nothing isn't the king's land;  the people who lead the lands, no one isn't the king's subjects."

Son of Heaven

The Son of Heaven was a title of the Emperor based on the Mandate of Heaven. The Son of Heaven is a universal emperor who rules tianxia comprising "all under heaven". The title was not interpreted literally. The monarch is a mortal chosen by Heaven, not its actual descendant. The title comes from the Mandate of Heaven, created by the monarchs of the Zhou dynasty to justify deposing the Shang dynasty. They declared that Heaven had revoked the mandate from the Shang and given it to the Zhou in retaliation for their corruption and misrule. Heaven bestowed the mandate to whoever was best fit to rule. The title held the emperor responsible for the prosperity and security of his people through the threat of losing the mandate.

Unlike the Japanese emperor for example, Chinese political theory allowed for a change of dynasty as imperial families could be replaced. This is based on the concept of "Mandate of Heaven". The theory behind this was that the Chinese emperor acted as the "Son of Heaven". As the only legitimate ruler, his authority extended to "All under heaven" and had neighbors only in a geographical sense. He holds a mandate to which he had a valid claim to rule over (or to lead) everyone else in the world as long as he served the people well. If the ruler became immoral, then rebellion is justified and heaven would take away that mandate and give it to another. This single most important concept legitimized the dynastic cycle or the change of dynasties regardless of social or ethnic background. This principle made it possible for dynasties founded by families of non-noble origins such as the Han dynasty and the Ming dynasty or non-ethnic Han dynasties such as the Mongol-led Yuan dynasty and the Manchu-led Qing dynasty. It was moral integrity and benevolent leadership that determined the holder of the "Mandate of Heaven." Every dynasty that self-consciously adopted this administrative practice powerfully reinforced this Sinocentric concept throughout the history of imperial China. Historians noted that this was one of the key reasons why imperial China in many ways had the most efficient system of government in ancient times.

Finally, it was generally not possible for a woman to succeed to the throne and in the history of China there has only been one reigning Empress, Wu Zetian (624–705 CE), who usurped the throne of the Tang dynasty.

Self-made titles 
Xiang Yu styled himself, Xīchǔ Bàwáng (“西楚霸王,” lit. Hegemon-King of Western Chu).

Non-Han titles taken by Chinese rulers 
Emperor Taizong of Tang was crowned Tian Kehan 天可汗, or "heavenly Khagan", after defeating the Gokturks, (Tujue).

Monarchical titles
Chinese monarchs possessed an elaborate set of monarchical titles, both when they were alive and after their death. Based on Chinese historiographical convention, monarchs of China are typically referred to by one of their many titles, although it is not incorrect per se to reference them using other titles that they held. Even though exceptions exist, Chinese rulers until the end of the Sui dynasty are mainly referred to by their posthumous names, monarchs from the Tang dynasty to the Yuan dynasty are generally known by their temple names, while rulers from the Ming dynasty onwards are typically known by their era names. As some of these titles were used repeatedly throughout history, historians often reference the name of the regime to avoid potential confusion. The same monarchical tradition was adopted throughout the Chinese cultural sphere.

General format in Mandarin Chinese:

Regnal name

Regnal names were monarchical titles adopted during the reign of monarchs or after their abdication. Due to naming taboo, regnal names were the most straightforward method Chinese rulers could be referred to during the rule of his/her regime.

Era name

Era names were proclaimed by Chinese sovereigns for the purpose of identifying and numbering years since 140 BC, during the reign of the Emperor Wu of Han. Strictly speaking, era names were not personal titles of Chinese monarchs per se. However, as most rulers of the Ming and Qing dynasties adopted only one era name throughout the entirety of their reigns, era names have come to be closely associated with Ming and Qing monarchs, to the extent that they are frequently referenced using their respective era names by historians.

Although a specific era name could be used by one monarch only, there were also many instances in which an era name was used by multiple monarchs, or a monarch could proclaim numerous era names throughout his/her reign. For this reason, it would be tedious for Chinese monarchs before the Ming dynasty to be referred to by their era names.

Temple name

Temple names were accorded to Chinese monarchs after their death, for the purpose of ancestor worship.

Posthumous name

Posthumous names were accorded to Chinese monarchs after their death. These were adjectives originally intended to determine the achievements and moral values, or the lack thereof, of one's life.

Historiographical denomination
Historians sometimes refer to certain Chinese rulers using generic terms, mostly due to their lack of regnal name, temple name or posthumous name. These terms describe the circumstances of the monarchs and are not officially accorded by the regimes themselves. The monarchical rank held by the rulers is affixed to the back of these adjectives to form the full historiographical denominations. For example, "" is formed from the amalgamation of "" ("deposed") and the abbreviated form of "" ("emperor"), thus is used to refer to monarchs who were overthrown.

See also

References

Citations

Sources 

 Yap, Joseph P. (2009). "Official Titles and Institutional Terms - Qin and Han" pp612–620 and Chapter 1. pp 38–39 in "Wars With The Xiongnu - A Translation From Zizhi tongjian" . AuthorHouse. 
 
 

Political history of China
Heads of state

Chinese government officials